Anja Steinbauer (born 1966) is a London-based Sinologist and philosopher. She was born in Mainz, Germany. She is notable as one of the pioneers of the popular philosophy movement, and is the president of Philosophy For All in London. She is also one of the editors of the popularizing magazine Philosophy Now.

Much of Steinbauer's scholarly work has related to the Chinese New Confucian philosopher Tang Junyi. This formed the basis for her PhD, which she took at Hamburg University.

For some years Steinbauer taught philosophy as part of the adult education department at Birkbeck College in London. When the courses at Birkbeck were cut as a cost-saving measure in 2010, she and six other ex-Birkbeck philosophy tutors joined together to found a new college: the London School of Philosophy (LSP). The LSP's first-ever lecture was given by Anja Steinbauer in January 2011, on the subject "Philosophy and Literature".

Writings
 Tang Junyis System der neun Horizonte des Geistes,  (2005), Hamburger Sinologische Gesellschaft.
 200 Words to Help You Talk About Philosophy,  (2020), Laurence King Publishing.
 A Philosophical Symphony: Tang Junyi's System Anja Steinbauer
 What's New in... Chinese Philosophy? Philosophy Now Issue 23, Anja Steinbauer

External links
 Philosophy For All website
 London School of Philosophy website

Living people
21st-century German philosophers
1966 births
Writers from Mainz